The P. Sue Beckwith, M.D., Boathouse, or simply Beckwith Boathouse, is an athletic facility at the University of Iowa. The building primarily serves the university's women's rowing team. The university's club men's rowing team also uses the facility, along with the Hawkeye Community Rowing Program and the Old Capitol Rowing Club.  It was a joint project of the City of Iowa City, the Athletics Department and Recreational Services of the University of Iowa.  designed by Iowa-based Neumann Monson Architects. Groundbreaking took place on March 12, 2008. The boathouse was dedicated on September 18, 2009.   The Boathouse project cost US$7.2 million and includes... a terrace, training area, locker room, meeting room, storage space, easy access to the Iowa River, and a UI College of Engineering-designed indoor rowing tank. It's also the first UI building designed to meet the standards for the U.S. Green Building Council's Leadership in Energy and Environmental Design certification.

P. Sue Beckwith 
P. Sue Beckwith is a former alumni of the University of Iowa.  She obtained a bachelor's of science degree in psychology in 1980 and completed her doctor of medicine degree in 1984. Following a fellowship in colon and rectal surgery at the Mayo Graduate School of Medicine in Rochester, Minnesota she returned to Des Moines to run a successful surgical practice. Beckwith when younger was a basketballer and began rowing later in life. The lack of rowing facilities for student athletes resulted in her lead pledging US$1 million towards the building of a new boathouse which was named in her honor.

Hawkeye Community Rowing Program 
The program is open to citizens of Iowa City and surrounding areas. It includes sessions for beginners and advanced for high schools and adults. It includes adaptive rowing for those with disabilities both physical and intellectual.

References 

University of Iowa campus
Boathouses in the United States
Sports venues completed in 2009
2009 establishments in Iowa